Ad Wijnands (Maastricht, 10 March 1959) is a Dutch former professional road bicycle racer, who won two stages in the 1981 Tour de France.

Major results

1980
Omloop der Kempen
1980
Ronde van Zuid-Holland
1981
GP E5
Six Days of Maastricht (with René Pijnen)
Simpelveld
Voerendaal
Tour of Belgium
Boxmeer
Scheldeprijs
Tour de France:
Winner stages 9 and 11
1982
Elsloo
GP Union Dortmund
Six Days of Maastricht (with René Pijnen)
Thorn
1983
Maastricht
GP Impanis
Boxmeer
Helden-Panningen
Hoogerheide
1985
Antibes
Tegelen
1986
Hansweert
Ronde van Limburg
Grote 1-Mei Prijs
Wielsbeke
Maastricht
1988
Grand Prix d'Ouverture La Marseillaise
Helchteren
1989
Ede
Wingene
1990
Coca-Cola Trophy
GP Forbo
Polder-Kempen
Profronde van Maastricht
Schorndorf
1991
Hengelo
Étoile de Bessèges
1992
Profronde van Heerlen
1993
Profronde van Maastricht

External links 

Dutch male cyclists
1959 births
Living people
Dutch Tour de France stage winners
Sportspeople from Maastricht
Cyclists from Limburg (Netherlands)